Ian David Bartholomew (born 8 February 1983) is an English cricketer, glaciologist and insurer.

Education
He was educated at Berkhamsted School; Christ's College, Cambridge (B.A. Geography 2002–05, M.Phil Polar Studies 2005–06) and the University of Edinburgh (Ph.D. Glaciology 2007–11), his doctoral thesis "Hydrology and dynamics of a land-terminating Greenland outlet glacier" being published in 2012.

Cricket
Bartholomew played one first-class match for Cambridge University Cricket Club: in the University Match of 2006 he scored 18 and 42 opening the batting, being dismissed by Michael Munday in both innings.

Catastrophe insurance
Bartholomew previously worked on catastrophe modelling at Risk Management Solutions (RMS), which developed a parametric insurance model  for New York City after Hurricane Sandy. In 2017, Bartholomew co-founded FloodFlash, a London-based flood insurance provider which pays out on a parametric basis (if water levels exceed a pre-agreed threshold according to an installed sensor) rather than on an assessment of damages.

See also
 List of Cambridge University Cricket Club players

References

External links
 

1983 births
Living people
People educated at Berkhamsted School
Alumni of Christ's College, Cambridge
Alumni of the University of Edinburgh
English cricketers
Cambridge University cricketers
Sportspeople from Hemel Hempstead
British glaciologists